Cold Fear is a 2005 survival horror third-person shooter video game developed by Darkworks and published by Ubisoft for PlayStation 2, Xbox and Microsoft Windows. It was Ubisoft's first horror game, and Darkworks' second game, after Alone in the Dark: The New Nightmare in 2001. The game is centered on Tom Hansen, a member of the United States Coast Guard, who comes to the aid of a Russian whaler in the Bering Strait and finds a mysterious parasite has turned the crew into zombie-like creatures. Discovering the involvement of both the Russian mafia and the CIA, Hansen sets out to ensure the parasites don't reach land.

The game was first announced at Electronic Entertainment Expo (E3) in 2004. To make the ship roll realistically, the developers had to write a completely new program (dubbed the "Darkwave editor") to allow them to control movement on both the vertical and the horizontal axes. They also used real physics to simulate the movement patterns of inanimate objects on the ship. Due to the random nature created by this, the player character required nine times the number of animations usually seen in third-person games. Ultimately, the game contained more than nine hundred separate animations for all characters, allowing for over five thousand possible character movements. The game's soundtrack was composed by Tom Salta, with Marilyn Manson contributing a song from his 2003 album The Golden Age of Grotesque.

Cold Fear was met with mixed reviews, with many critics comparing it unfavorably to Resident Evil 4. Although critics were generally impressed with the environments and the opening scenes, they found the game too short and felt it failed to live up to its promising beginning. The game was a commercial failure; by February 2006, it had sold only 70,000 units across all three platforms in the United States.

Gameplay
Cold Fear is a survival horror third-person shooter played from either a third-person fixed camera perspective or an over-the-shoulder camera, depending on the player's preferences.

The main enemies in the game are Russian mercenaries and various types of zombie-like creatures known as "Exos" (creatures infected by a parasitic organism known as an "Exocel"). Exos include "Exomutants" (mercenaries infected with Exocels), "Exoshades" (creatures which can see perfectly in the dark), "Exospectres" (which can turn transparent for brief periods of time) and "Exomasses" (a hugely strong but deformed creature created as a result of a failed experiment). Most infected enemies can be knocked down with two or three shots, but unless the brain is destroyed, they will not die, and will eventually attack Hansen again. Players can destroy the brain either by shooting enemy in the head, or knocking them down and stomping on their head. If an enemy gets close to Hansen, the player can perform a critical hit by pressing a combination of buttons. All exos carry at least one exocel within them. When the exo is killed, the exocel may emerge and attack Hansen, or, if there are any other dead bodies in the area, infect and re-animate that body. Exocels are fast, but very weak and can be killed with one gunshot.

The first half of the game is set on a whaler in the middle of a storm, and the conditions on the deck affect the degree of control the player has over Hansen. As the ship sways continuously from side to side, aiming is made more difficult, although Hansen can grab onto a ledge to steady himself, if one is available. In some instances, the ship can sway to such a degree that Hansen will slide towards the edge and potentially fall overboard. There are also numerous environmental hazards on the deck which react to the motion of the ship, such as swinging electrical wires and crates hooked up to ropes. If any of these items hit Hansen, he will lose health. Waves crashing on to the ship's deck can also cause Hansen damage.

The game also features a Resistance gauge, which decreases as the player performs certain actions, such as running, although running is not possible when in over-the-shoulder mode. If Hansen falls off the edge of the ship, he can hang onto the side as long as he has resistance left, but if he doesn't climb back aboard quickly enough, he will fall into the ocean.

The game does not feature an inventory, and neither health packs nor ammo can be stockpiled. Health packs are used immediately upon collection, and no more ammo can be collected than the capacity of the specific weapon. Players can find ammo and health packs distributed throughout the game at certain predetermined locations and also by looting the bodies of fallen enemies.

Plot
The game begins with a Navy SEAL team deploying on a Russian whaler, the Eastern Spirit, in the Bering Strait. As the team explore the deck, they are attacked and killed by unseen beings that literally rips them apart. Seeing his team is gone, CIA Special Agent Jason Bennett, who is supervising the mission from another location, orders any other government vessel in the vicinity to investigate. His call is picked up by the US Coast Guard ship, the USCGC Ravenswood, which heads to the Eastern Spirit. The crew of the Ravenswood split into teams, but within moments of boarding, only one remains; Tom Hansen, a former U.S. Army Special Forces soldier, currently serving in the United States Coast Guard, who hears his shipmates being killed over the radio. He sets out to explore the ship and determine what is happening.

As soon as he enters the interior of the Spirit, however, he is attacked by two frightened Russians, who he is forced to kill. As he continues to explore, he encounters a multitude of panicking Russians, all of whom attack him. He also finds several horrifically mutilated bodies, including that of the Ravenswoods captain, Lt. Lansing. Hansen soon learns of a creature known as an "exocel", which was accidentally discovered by the crew of a Russian oil rig, the Star of Sakhalin, owned by Colonel Dmitriy Yusupov, a member of the Russian mafia, and staffed by Major Yuri Anischenko and his team of mercenaries. Yusupov came to realize the exocels were parasitic organisms, which used other living organisms as hosts, and as such, he brought Dr. Viktor Kamsky to the Sakhalin to begin experimenting with infecting various species with exocel serum. These experiments led to the discovery that exocels could re-animate recently deceased humans, and the creation of an antidote to counter infection. Hansen heads to the radio room to request help, but instead he is answered by Bennett, who tells him that Yusupov is on board and must be captured for questioning. Bennett tells Hansen that if he finds Yusupov, the CIA will get him off the ship.

Hansen locates Yusupov, who tells him that Anna Kamsky, Viktor's daughter, is onboard and must be saved. Yusupov had brought her to Sakhalin to blackmail Viktor into turning the exocels into biological weapons. Eventually, Viktor and his colleague, Dr. Pavel Bakharev, began to experiment on live human infection, and the Eastern Spirit was on its way from the Sakhalin to collect the next batch of human specimens supplied by the Mafia when the exocel outbreak occurred. An exocel then bursts out of Yusupov's chest, killing him. Hansen finds Anna, who tells them they must go to the radio room and contact her father. They contact the rig, but Bakharev tells Anna that Kamsky is missing and pleads with her not to return. She says no, telling Bakharev she will see him soon. They turn the ship back towards the Sakhalin but because the seas are so rough, they are unable to dock with the platform. As such, they head to the crow's nest and jump from the ship when it collides with the rig. Hansen makes the jump, but Anna falls into the sea.

Hansen soon finds Bakharev, who tells him that to disable the radio jammer around the rig so he can contact Bennett, he will need Anischenko to get him past a retinal scanner. Bakharev is then dragged into an air duct and killed. Hansen learns that Kamsky and Bakharev were under orders to make the exocels as dangerous as possible, which they had succeeded in doing, but without any way to control the resulting creatures. Hansen finds and kills Anischenko, removing his eye and using it to deactivate the radio jammer. Once back in touch with Bennett, Hansen is told he must find Kamsky's laptop and transmit the exocel research. Meanwhile, Anna is rescued from the sea by a large creature and left in a lab, where she is infected by an exocel. Seeing this take place on a security monitor, Hansen races to the lab to give Anna the antidote.

He makes it to her in time and administers the antidote before the infection can take hold. Bennett then contacts him and Hansen makes him promise that if he gives Bennett the research, Bennett will save Anna. He soon discovers that Kamsky infected himself with a strain of exocel DNA, and now wishes to do the same to Anna. Hansen finds Kamsky's laptop and transmits the antidote data to Bennett, but nothing else. As a furious Bennett berates Hansen, he and Anna agree to blow up the rig using C4. As Hansen plants the charges, he learns Kamsky had gone completely insane; after infecting himself with exocel serum, he released the imprisoned exos on the rig and planted a group of exocels on the Eastern Spirit. He then went into hiding to await his metamorphosis. When Hansen has planted all of the charges, he heads to the heliport to meet Anna. Before they can take off however, they are attacked by a mutated Kamsky; the same creature who rescued Anna from the sea. Kamsky is desperate for Anna to remain with him on the rig, but Hansen is able to fight him off and kill him. He and Anna then escape in a helicopter as the rig explodes below them.

Development
Cold Fear was first announced at E3 in 2004 when the title was included on a list of upcoming games. According to Sony, the game was set to be published by Namco. On October 6, however, Ubisoft announced they would be publishing the Darkworks developed game in March 2005 for PlayStation 2, Xbox and PC. The game would be Ubisoft's first horror game, and Darkworks' second game, after Alone in the Dark: The New Nightmare in 2001. A playable demo version was released in December.

To make the Eastern Spirit roll realistically in the storm, the developers had to write a completely new program. They found that making the ship move was easy, but getting it to respond to storm conditions was much more complex. As such, they created a complete roll editor, called the Darkwave editor, which allowed them to control the pitch (when the ship moves on the horizontal axis) and the roll (when it moves on the vertical axis) separately. The combination of moving the ship on both axes allowed the developers to create realistic ship movements. This in turn allowed them to time the exact movement of the ship to coincide with what was happening in the game without having to use a cutscene. However, creating such a realistic movement system led to camera problems. According to programmer, Claude Levastre, early in development, "the camera was constantly going through the walls because of the roll movement. So we had to develop an inertia-control system for the camera, just as if a cameraman is using a steadicam behind the hero". Another change brought about by the ship's motion was that initially, the movement patterns of inanimate objects on the ship were scripted, but this was later replaced with real physics.

The ship's constant movement also impacted character animation. Once the ship's movement reached a certain angle, Hansen and any other characters on deck start to slide, and have to compensate in whatever direction was necessary relative to their position. According to Levastre, this meant Hansen required nine times the animations usually seen in third-person games (center, front, back, left, right and four intermediary positions). Ultimately, Hansen had two hundred and fifty separate animations, and most of the non-player characters had one hundred and fifty. According to Antonin Delboy, lead animator on the game, "all the technical decisions were taken in favor of animation, both in terms of quality and quantity, which is very rare on this kind of project". Basic animation was produced with 3D Studio Max software. Inverse kinematics were then used to create the nine directional animations, with the engine calculating the level of character compensation depending on the angle of the ship. Each character movement is composed of basic animation and compensation animation, and Delboy says that in total, the game contains more than nine hundred animations, allowing for over five thousand possible movements. Levastre stated that "the interaction between the storm and the characters that are on the deck sometimes creates some really breathtaking moments. And on top of that, we managed to offer some really intense action sequences featuring far more enemies than in most horror games".

Music
Marilyn Manson contributed to a song to the game; "Use Your Fist and Not Your Mouth", from his 2003 album The Golden Age of Grotesque.

The soundtrack was composed by Tom Salta. Salta had been hired in November 2004, with his first finished track submitted on November 16. The completed score was handed in on December 23. According to Salta, he had to compose over twenty different individual pieces as well as music for nine cutscenes.

Reception

Cold Fear received "mixed or average reviews" on all three platforms; the PlayStation 2 version holds an aggregate score of 68 out of 100 on Metacritic, based on thirty-nine reviews, the Xbox version 71 out of 100, based on forty-one reviews, and the PC version 66 out of 100, based on thirteen reviews.

Eurogamer's Kristan Reed was unimpressed with the game, calling it "a bit half-baked". He praised the opening of the game, arguing that, like Hansen himself, the player feels a strong sense of disorientation as they get used to being on the ship in the middle of a storm. However, he felt the strong opening soon gives way to clichés. He was highly critical of the absence of a map, arguing that because the environments all look similar, getting lost is a regular occurrence. GameSpot's Carrie Gouskos scored the PlayStation 2 version 6.9 out of 10 and the Xbox version 7.2 out of 10. She argued: "Atmospherically, Cold Fear is derivative and predictable, which is a shame considering that it is, at times, an enjoyable action game". Although she praised the outdoor scenes on the boat, she felt there were not enough of them, with too many "generic indoor locations". She was also highly critical of the lack of a map and the autosave feature, feeling the save points were unevenly distributed.

GameSpy's Will Tuttle scored the PlayStation 2 version 3 out of 5 and the Xbox version 3.5 out of 5. He praised the setting, atmosphere and over-the-shoulder camera, but was critical of the lack of a map. He called the game as a solid little thriller. Game Revolution's JP Hurh gave the game a B-. He too criticized the length of the game, the lack of a map and the autosave feature, which he found too random. He praised the graphics and sound, but concluded: "With so much attention paid to the environments, Darkworks almost made a great game. Unfortunately, it's only half a great game [...] The ending as well as many portions along the way feel rushed". IGN's Ed Lewis scored the PlayStation 2 version 7.2 out of 10 and the Xbox version 7.6 out of 10. He praised the over-the-shoulder camera and the setting, but also criticized the lack of a map.

Sales
The game was met with extremely poor sales figures. By February 2006, it had sold only 70,000 units across all three platforms in the US.

Film adaptation
In April 2006, Variety reported that Avatar Films and Sekretagent Productions had co-purchased the rights for a feature film adaptation of the game. However, there have since been no further developments, with the project presumably cancelled.

See also
 2005 in video games

References

External links
 
 

2005 video games
Darkworks games
2000s horror video games
Naval video games
PlayStation 2 games
RenderWare games
Single-player video games
Third-person shooters
Ubisoft games
Video games about police officers
Video games developed in France
Video games scored by Tom Salta
Video games set in the 2000s
Windows games
Xbox games
Video games about zombies